Field Hockey was among the sports at the 7th All Africa Games held in September 1999 in Johannesburg, South Africa. The play featured both a men's and women's tournament. The winners of each tournament qualified for the 2000 Summer Olympics.

Medal summary

Medal table
The Medal table is as follows:

Results

Final standings

References

1999 All-Africa Games
All-Africa Games
Field hockey at the African Games
All-Africa Games
1999
1999 All-Africa Games